The United States Army Aviation and Missile Command (AMCOM) develops, acquires, fields and sustains aviation, missile and unmanned aerial vehicles. AMCOM is primarily responsible for lifecycle management of army missile, helicopter, unmanned ground vehicle and unmanned aerial vehicle weapon system. The central part of AMCOM's mission involves ensuring readiness through acquisition and sustainment support for aviation systems, missile systems, and test, measurement, and diagnostic equipment (TMDE) throughout their life cycle. The command is headquartered at Redstone Arsenal in Huntsville, Alabama, has a 2019 "budget of more $3.7 billion, and a global workforce of more than 15,000 military and civilian employees".

AMCOM works closely with The U.S. Army Combat Capabilities Development Command Aviation & Missile Center (AvMC) which operates simulation facilities to evaluate missile components, such as seekers, in a variety of flights and countermeasures environments. AMCOM also has access to several wind tunnels to test full-size helicopters, a vertical motion simulator for flight control evaluation and a crash-testing tower used to improve safety.

AMCOM's Test, Measurement and Diagnostic Equipment Activity provides worldwide command and control over a broad metrology and calibration program. AMCOM is also the leader in foreign military sales, accounting for over 50 percent of total army sales to Allied forces and friendly foreign nations. AMCOM's main organizations are organized into "centers":
Acquisition Center – responsible for contracting support.
AMCOM Logistics Center (ALC) – responsible for logistics support.

LCMC
U.S. Army Aviation and Missile Life Cycle Management Command is an LCMC. Thus it has an associated contracting center. This LCMC Aviation and Missile Life Cycle Management Command was formerly Aviation and Missile Command (1997).
This LCMC "purchases about $1 billion worth of aircraft and missile parts each year."

Chronology
The U.S. Army Missile Command was formally established on 23 May 1962 at Redstone Arsenal to manage the army's missile systems.

October 1948: The Chief of Ordnance designates Redstone Arsenal as the center for ordnance research and development in the field of rockets.
1 June 1949: The Chief of Ordnance officially activates the arsenal as the site of the Ordnance Rocket Center.
28 October 1949: The Secretary of the Army approves the transfer of the Ordnance Research and Development Division Sub-Office (Rocket) at Fort Bliss, Texas, to Redstone Arsenal as the Ordnance Guided Missile Center.
1 February 1956: The U.S. Army Ballistic Missile Agency (ABMA) established at Redstone Arsenal.
March, 1958: Organizations placed under the new Army Ordnance Missile Command (AOMC) include the ABMA, Redstone Arsenal, the Jet Propulsion Laboratory, White Sands Proving Grounds and the Army Rocket and Guided Missile Agency (ARGMA)
1958: ABMA's scientific and engineering staff (Wernher von Braun et al.) transferred to the newly created NASA Marshall Space Flight Center at the southern half of Redstone Arsenal
1958: The Pershing Project Manager's Office was created.
23 May 1962: U.S. Army Missile Command (MICOM) officially established;, fully staffed and operational on 1 August 1962.
28 February 1964: The U.S. Army Aviation and Surface Material Command redesignated as the U.S. Army Aviation Materiel Command (AVCOM).
23 September 1968: AVCOM redesignated the U.S. Army Aviation Systems Command (AVSCOM).
1 July 1977: AVSCOM discontinued and its readiness mission combined with that of the U.S. Army Troop Support Command (TROSCOM) to form the U.S. Army Troop Support and Aviation Materiel Readiness Command (TSARCOM). AVSCOM's aviation research and development mission assigned to the newly established U.S. Army Aviation Research and Development Command (AVRADCOM).
1 March 1984: AVSCOM reestablished and all missions and activities of AVRADCOM and the aviation related missions and activities of the Troop Support and Aviation Materiel Readiness Command transferred to AVSCOM.
1 October 1992: Army Aviation and Troop Command established, consolidating the existing missions of AVSCOM and TROSCOM less those missions and organizations transferred to other commands.
8 September 1995: Congress approves the 1995 Base Realignment and Closure Commission list, disestablishing ATCOM and transfers its mission and organizations to Redstone Arsenal to merge with the Army Missile Command to form AMCOM.
17 July 1997: Army Aviation and Missile Command is provisionally established.
1 October 1997: AMCOM formally established at Redstone Arsenal with the merger of the U.S. Army Missile Command (MICOM) at Redstone Arsenal and the U.S. Army Aviation and Troop Command (ATCOM) at St. Louis, Missouri

List of commanding generals
Major General James R. Myles,
Major General James E. Rogers, 10 September 2010
Major General Lynn A. Collyar, 1 June 2012
Major General James M. Richardson, 12 June 2014
Major General Douglas Gabram, 18 February 2016
William Marriott, 14 February 2019 (acting)
Major General K. Todd Royar, 10 June 2019
Major General Thomas W. O'Connor Jr., 12 August 2022

See also
Anti-aircraft warfare
Terminal High Altitude Area Defense (THAAD)

References

External links

 Official site

Aviation and Missile Command
Aviation and Missile Command